Robin Lee "Rob" Hicklin (August 6, 1937 – September 22, 2006) was an American football coach. He served as the head football coach at Missouri Western University in Saint Joseph, Missouri from 1974 to 1985 and Southern Arkansas University from 1986 to 1989.

Head coaching record

College

References

1937 births
2006 deaths
Missouri Western Griffons football coaches
Southern Arkansas Muleriders football coaches
William Penn Statesmen football coaches
High school football coaches in Missouri
Missouri Valley College alumni
People from Saline County, Missouri
Players of American football from Missouri